Marija Golubeva (born 28 June 1973) is a Latvian politician, political scientist, and historian.  She is a member of the 13th Saeima and leader of the Development/For! Saeima fraction, and she also was elected by the Presidium of the Saeima to serve in the Saeima Secretariat. She served as Minister of the Interior of Latvia. In her academic work, she specializes in the politics of education and immigration.

Life and career
Golubeva studied English philology at the University of Latvia, graduating with a Bachelor's Degree in 1994. In 1995, she obtained a Master's Degree in history from the Central European University. She then attended the University of Cambridge, where she earned her doctorate in 2000.

In 1999, Golubeva became a Lecturer at the Latvian Academy of Culture, where she taught courses in cultural history. In the 2001–2002 school year, she was the acting head of the Department of Political Science at Riga Stradiņš University, and the following year she served as the head of a research center at The Vidzeme University of Applied Sciences. She then worked as a consultant at the State Chancellery, and from 2004 to 2012 and again from 2014 to 2016 she worked as a researcher at the Latvian public policy research center Providus. She has also consulted for ICF International. She particularly specializes in the study of education policy and immigration policy.

In 2017, Golubeva was a founding member of the Movement For! party, and she was elected to its first board.

In the 2018 Latvian parliamentary election, Golubeva was elected to the Saeima. She was then also elected Secretary of the Saeima.

Golubeva is the second openly LGBT member of the Saeima in Latvian history, after Edgars Rinkēvičs. She was also one of the record high number of women elected to the Saeima in that election.

References

Living people
Latvian political scientists
21st-century Latvian women writers
Women political scientists
Deputies of the 13th Saeima
21st-century Latvian women politicians
Women deputies of the Saeima
Latvian LGBT politicians
Lesbian politicians
1973 births